Datunludong station is an interchange station of Line 5 and Line 15 on the Beijing Subway.

History 

The line 5 station opened on October 27, 2007. It was too small to handle the interchange between line 5 and 15, so the line 15 station was left unopened when the western extension was opened in December 2014. From October to December 2015, the line 5 station was closed to widen the station and build a transfer corridor. The line 15 station opened on December 26, 2015, one year later than the other stations on the line.

Station layout 
The line 5 station has 2 elevated side platforms. The line 15 station has an underground island platform.

Exits 
There are 6 exits, lettered A1, B1, B2, G, H1, and H2. Exits A1, B1, and H1 are accessible.

Gallery

References

External links
 

Beijing Subway stations in Chaoyang District
Railway stations in China opened in 2007